The 8th Infantry Division, ("Pathfinder") was an infantry division of the United States Army during the 20th century. The division served in World War I, World War II, and Operation Desert Storm. Initially activated in January 1918, the unit did not see combat during World War I and returned to the United States. Some units would serve in the American Expeditionary Force to Siberia. Activated again on 1 July 1940 as part of the build-up of military forces prior to the United States' entry into World War II, the division saw extensive action in the European Theatre of Operations. Following World War II, the division was moved to West Germany, where it remained stationed at the Rose Barracks in Bad Kreuznach until it was inactivated on 17 January 1992.

History

World War I
Activated: January 1918
Overseas: November 1918
Commanders:
Col. Elmore F. Taggart (5 January – 14 February 1918)
 Col. G. L. Van Deusen (15–24 February 1918)
 Brig. Gen. Joseph D. Leitch (25 February – 9 March 1918; 18 March–17 July 1918; 4–10 August 1918; 12 August – 1 September 1918 )
 Maj. Gen. John Frank Morrison (10–17 March 1918)
 Maj. Gen. William S. Graves (18 July – 3 August 1918; 11 August 1918)
 Maj. Gen. Eli A. Helmick (2 September 1918 – 19 November 1918; 26 November 1918 –)
 Brig. Gen. John J. Bradley (20–26 November 1918)

Organization

The 8th Division was organized at Camp Fremont, California, from men of the Regular Army, 3 August 1918.

 Headquarters, 8th Division
 15th Infantry Brigade
 12th Infantry Regiment
 62nd Infantry Regiment
 23rd Machine Gun Battalion
 16th Infantry Brigade
 8th Infantry Regiment
 13th Infantry Regiment
 24th Machine Gun Battalion 
 8th Field Artillery Brigade
 2nd Field Artillery Regiment (155 mm)
 81st Field Artillery Regiment (75 mm)
 83rd Field Artillery Regiment (75 mm)
 8th Trench Mortar Battery
 22nd Machine Gun Battalion
 319th Engineer Regiment
 320th Field Signal Battalion
 Headquarters Troop, 8th Division
 8th Train Headquarters and Military Police
 8th Ammunition Train
 8th Supply Train
 8th Engineer Train
 8th Sanitary Train
 11th, 31st, 32nd, and 43rd Ambulance Companies and Field Hospitals

Moving abroad
Major General Graves, with his staff, 5000 men, and 100 officers, transferred to Siberia in August 1918 to occupy the city of Vladivostok in Russia as part of the intervention in the Russian Civil War, and Major General Eli A. Helmick succeeded Graves in command of the division. The overseas movement of the division to Europe began 30 October 1918. The 8th Field Artillery Brigade, 8th Infantry Brigade, 16th Infantry Brigade headquarters, and the 319th Engineer Regiment were the only divisional units to go to France. The 13th and 62nd Infantry Regiments were at sea when recalled after the Armistice, and the 12th Infantry did not leave its pre-embarkation point at Camp Mills, New York, because it was quarantined for Spanish influenza.

The troops who did reach France became the garrison of Brest and assisted in building huge camps for troops about to embark for return to the United States. The 8th Infantry Regiment became part of the American occupation forces in Germany until August 1919 and the remainder returned to the United States in January 1919, after which the division disbanded.

Between wars
The 8th Division officially demobilized at Camp Lee, Virginia, in September 1919. The division was partially reconstituted on 24 March 1923, allotted to the Third Corps Area for mobilization purposes, and assigned to the III Corps. Camp George G. Meade, Maryland, was its designated mobilization station for reactivation. The 16th Infantry Brigade (12th and 34th Infantry Regiments), the 1st Battalion, 16th Field Artillery Regiment, the 15th Ordnance Company, and the 8th Tank Company (Light) were assigned to the division in October 1933 as Regular Army active units and formed the force from which the remainder of the division would be reactivated in the event of war. The commanding general of the brigade was considered the division commander for planning purposes. The 16th Infantry Brigade was stationed at Fort Howard, Maryland, from 1922 to 1928; Fort Hunt, Virginia, from 1928 to 1931; in Washington, D.C., from 1931 to 1936; and at Fort Meade from 1936 to the activation of the division.

The division headquarters was organized in April 1926 at Philadelphia, Pennsylvania, as a Regular Army Inactive unit using personnel of the Organized Reserve, and by mid-1927, most of the division's other inactive elements were also organized as such. The active units of the division conducted annual training with the III and XIII Corps and the 79th, 80th, and 99th Divisions. Summer training camps were usually conducted at Camp Meade.

The 16th Infantry Brigade's 12th and 34th Infantry Regiments, reinforced by the 3d Cavalry and the District of Columbia National Guard's 260th Coast Artillery, were called out on 28 July 1932 to quell potential trouble from the Bonus Army in Washington, D.C. The 12th Infantry was ordered to clear the United States Capitol and the camps on the Anacostia Flats of the veterans that afternoon. From June 1936 to August 1937, the 16th Brigade was commanded by Lorenzo D. Gasser, who went on to serve as the army's assistant chief of staff for personnel (G-1) and Deputy Chief of Staff of the United States Army.

The division was also provisionally organized in 1939 for the First Army Maneuvers at Manassas, Virginia, with the 16th Brigade reinforced by the 66th Infantry (Light Tanks). In preparation for becoming a "triangular" division, the 8th Infantry Division was reactivated on 1 July 1940 at Fort Jackson, South Carolina, without its Reserve units and assigned to the I Corps
.

World War II
Activated: 1 July 1940 at Camp Jackson, South Carolina
Trained at Fort Leonard Wood, Missouri in late 1942
'''Trained at Camp Laguna in Arizona in 1943Overseas: 5 December 1943Campaigns:
Normandy
Northern France
Rhineland
Central EuropeDays of combat: 266.Distinguished Unit Citations: 5Awards: Medal of Honor – 3 ; Distinguished Service Cross (United States) – 33 ; Distinguished Service Medal (United States) – 2 ; Silver Star – 768; LM – 12 ; DFC – 2 ; SM – 24; BSM – 2,874; PH – 1 ; AM – 107.Commanders:
Maj. Gen. Philip B. Peyton (June 1940 – December 1940)
 Maj. Gen. James P. Marley (December 1940 – February 1941)
 Maj. Gen. William E. Shedd (February 1941)
 Maj. Gen. Henry Terrell Jr. (March 1941)
 Maj. Gen. James P. Marley (April 1941 – July 1942)
 Maj. Gen. Paul E. Peabody (August 1942 – January 1943)
 Maj. Gen. William C. McMahon (February 1943 – July 1944)
 Maj. Gen. Donald A. Stroh (July 1944 – December 1944)
 Maj. Gen. William G. Weaver (December 1944 – February 1945)
 Maj. Gen. Bryant E. Moore (February 1945 – November 1945)
Maj. Gen. William M. Miley (November 1945 to inactivation).Returned to U.S.: 10 July 1945.Inactivated: at Fort Leonard Wood, Missouri, 20 November 1945.

Order of battle

 Headquarters, 8th Infantry Division
13th Infantry Regiment
28th Infantry Regiment
121st Infantry Regiment
 Headquarters and Headquarters Battery, 8th Infantry Division Artillery
 28th Field Artillery Battalion (155 mm)
 43rd Field Artillery Battalion (105 mm)
 45th Field Artillery Battalion (105 mm)
 56th Field Artillery Battalion (105 mm)
 12th Engineer Combat Battalion
 8th Medical Battalion
 8th Cavalry Reconnaissance Troop (Mechanized)
 Headquarters, Special Troops, 8th Infantry Division
 Headquarters Company, 8th Infantry Division
708th Ordnance Light Maintenance Company
8th Quartermaster Company
8th Signal Company
 Military Police Platoon
 Band
8th Counterintelligence Corps Detachment

Major General William C. McMahon was relieved shortly after the division arrived in Normandy. His replacement, Major General Donald A. Stroh was temporarily relieved during the Hurtgen fighting; the death of his son Harry, a pilot in the U.S. Army Air Forces who was shot down over Brittany, had made a deep psychological impact. After a rest, Stroh went on to command the 106th Infantry Division.

Combat chronicle
During World War II, the 8th Infantry Division was sent to Europe to fight against the Axis. After training in Northern Ireland the 8th Infantry Division landed on Utah Beach, Normandy, 4 July 1944, and entered combat on 7 July. Shortly after its arrival, the division captured the French cities of Rennes and Brest. Fighting through the hedgerows, it crossed the Ay River, 26 July, pushed through Rennes, 8 August, and attacked Brest, France in September. When U.S. Brigadier General Charles Canham, who was at the time the deputy commander of the 8th Infantry Division, arrived to accept the surrender of German troops in Brest, the commander of the Brest garrison, General Hermann-Bernhard Ramcke asked the lower-ranking man to show his credentials. Canham pointed to his nearby troops and said "These are my credentials". That phrase has since become the 8th Infantry Division's motto.

Following these actions, the 8th turned eastward toward the German border, taking part in the heavy fighting in the Hürtgen Forest in November 1944. The Crozon Peninsula was cleared on 19 September, and the division drove across France to Luxembourg, moved to the Hürtgen Forest, 20 November, cleared Hürtgen on the 28th and Brandenberg, 3 December, and pushed on to the Roer. That river was crossed on 23 February 1945, Duren taken on the 25th and the Erft Canal crossed on the 28th. The 8th reached the Rhine near Rodenkirchen, 7 March, and maintained positions along the river near Koeln. In early March 1945, the 8th had advanced into the Rhineland. It fought its way into the Ruhr region the following month.

On 6 April the division attacked northwest to aid in the destruction of enemy forces in the Ruhr Pocket, and by the 17th had completed its mission. After security duty, the division, under operational control of the British Second Army, drove across the Elbe, 1 May, and penetrated to Schwerin when the war in Europe ended.

On 2 May 1945, as it advanced into northern Germany, the 8th Infantry Division encountered the Neuengamme concentration camp Wöbbelin subcamp, near the city of Ludwigslust. The SS had established Wöbbelin in early February 1945 to house concentration camp prisoners who had been evacuated from other Nazi camps to prevent their liberation by the Allies. Wöbbelin held some 5,000 inmates, many of whom suffered from starvation and disease. The sanitary conditions at the camp when the 8th Infantry Division and the 82nd Airborne Division arrived were deplorable. There was little food or water, and some prisoners had resorted to cannibalism. In the first week after liberation, more than 200 inmates died. In the aftermath, the United States Army ordered the townspeople in Ludwigslust to visit the camp and bury the dead.

The 8th Infantry Division was recognized as a liberating unit by the U.S. Army's Center of Military History and the United States Holocaust Memorial Museum in 1988.

CasualtiesTotal battle casualties: 13,986Killed in action: 2,532Wounded in action: 10,057Missing in action: 729Prisoner of war: 668

Assignments in the European Theater of Operations
30 November 1943: Attached to First Army.
24 December 1943: XV Corps.
1 July 1944: VIII Corps, attached to First Army.
1 August 1944: VIII Corps, Third Army, 12th Army Group.
5 September 1944: VIII Corps, Ninth Army, 12th Army Group.
22 October 1944: VIII Corps, First Army, 12th Army Group.
19 November 1944: V Corps.
18 December 1944: VII Corps.
20 December 1944: Attached, with the entire First Army, to the British 21st Army Group.
22 December 1944: XIX Corps, Ninth Army (attached to British 21st Army Group), 12th Army Group.
3 February 1945: VII Corps, First Army, 12th Army Group.
2 April 1945: XVIII (Abn) Corps.
26 April 1945: XVIII (Abn) Corps, Ninth Army, 12th Army Group, but attached for operations to the British Second Army in the British 21st Army Group.

Medals of Honor
Three soldiers of the 8th Division were awarded the Medal of Honor in World War II.Private First Class Ernest Prussman, 13th Infantry Regiment. Prussman took over his squad on 8 September 1944 during the advance on Les Coates [wrong transliteration of Loscoat, near Brest] in Brittany, and disarmed several Germans, including a machine gun crew. Shot by a German rifleman, his dying act was to unleash a hand grenade that killed the man who shot him. His Medal of Honor was awarded posthumously.Private First Class Walter C. Wetzel, 13th Infantry Regiment. As acting squad leader in the regimental Anti-Tank Company, PFC Wetzel defended his platoon's command post from an enemy attack on 3 April 1945. Wetzel threw himself on either 1 or 2 enemy grenades (sources vary) thrown into the C.P. His Medal of Honor was awarded posthumously.Staff Sergeant John W. Minick', Company I, 121st Infantry Regiment. After his battalion was halted by enemy minefields during an advance on 21 November 1944 during the Hurtgen fighting, he led four men through the obstacle, then successfully destroyed an enemy machine gun post that had opened fire on the small party. Moving forward again, he single-handedly engaged an entire company of enemy soldiers, killing 20 men and capturing 20 more. Resuming the advance, he tried to scout through another minefield, but detonated a mine in the attempt. His Medal of Honor was awarded posthumously.

After World War II
The 8th Infantry Division was reactivated in 1950 as a training division at Fort Jackson, South Carolina and in 1954 became a regular infantry division. In 1956-57 it was sent to West Germany, initially on a temporary basis in Operation Gyroscope, but remained in West Germany for decades. The Division's First Brigade (with subordinate units) was stationed in Mainz, the Second Brigade (with subordinate units) was stationed in Baumholder, and the Third Brigade (with subordinate units) was stationed in Mannheim (Sullivan and Coleman Barracks). In 1974, an amendment by Senator Sam Nunn of Georgia led to two more brigades being organized for European service. The 4th Brigade, 4th Infantry Division ("Brigade-76") was dispatched to Europe in the fall of 1976. It was stationed in Wiesbaden, attached to the 8th Infantry Division, and for eight years, made it unique - the 8th ID became the Army's only four-brigade division. In 1984, the 4th Brigade was inactivated and the division's size fell to the standard three brigades. From December 1957, until it was inactivated in January 1992, the 8th Infantry Division was headquartered at Bad Kreuznach.

From the late 1950s until the early 1960s, the 8th Infantry Division was organized as a partially Airborne Pentomic division, with two of its five battle groups (the 1st Airborne Battle Group, 504th Infantry, and 1st Airborne Battle Group, 505th Infantry) on jump status. In 1963 the division was reorganized into a brigade structure with the 1st Brigade on jump status, and 1-504th was reorganized and reflagged as the 1st Battalion (Abn), 509th Infantry and 1-505th as the 2d Battalion (Abn), 509th Infantry. Supporting units throughout the division (for example, one field artillery battalion, one company of the engineer battalion, one platoon of the MP company, etc.) were also on jump status. The 8th Infantry Division operated its own jump school at Wiesbaden Air Base to support its 1st Brigade as well as other elements of the United States Army, Europe. In 1973 elements of the 1st Brigade were transferred to Vicenza, Italy, to establish a separate Airborne battalion combat team (1-509th INF) and the two Airborne infantry battalions were reorganized and reflagged as the 2d Battalion, 28th Infantry and the 2d Battalion, 87th Infantry. The reorganized 1st Brigade included a tank unit, the 4th Battalion, 69th Armor.

Desert Storm

Four battalions deployed to Operation Desert Storm.
 Attached to 3d Armored Division:
 4th Battalion, 34th Armor
 12th Engineer Battalion 
 5th Battalion, 3d Air Defense Artillery 
 Attached to the 42d Field Artillery Brigade:
 2d Battalion, 29th Field Artillery (M109A2/A3 155mm SP)

Inactivation
The 8th Infantry Division inactivated on 17 January 1992, with some elements being "reflagged" as part the 1st Armored Division, which had been stationed in southeastern West Germany.

 Commanders 

 Maj. Gen. Frank McConnel 	Aug 50 	Jan 51
 Maj. Gen. Harry J. Collins 	Jan 51 	Feb 52
 Maj. Gen. W.P. Sheppard 	Feb 52 	Jan 53
 Brig. Gen. John A. Dabney 	Jan 53 	Jan 54
 Maj. Gen. Riley E. Ennis 	Jan 54 	Jun 54
 Maj. Gen. Harry J. Collins 	Jun 54 	Aug 54
 Maj. Gen. Thomas L. Harold	Aug 54 	Nov 54
 Maj. Gen. Thomas L. Sherburne 	Sept 54 	Nov 54
 Maj. Gen. John G. Van Houten 	Nov 54 	Jan 56
 Maj. Gen. Thomas M Watlington 	Jun 56 	Aug 57
 Maj. Gen. Philip F. Lindman 	Aug 57 	Mar 59
 Maj. Gen. Loyd R. Moses 	Mar 59 	Oct 60
 Maj. Gen. Edgar C. Doleman 	Oct 60 	Oct 61
 Maj. Gen. Andrew Goodpaster  	Oct 61 	Oct 62
 Maj. Gen. Stanley R. Larsen 	Nov 62 	Apr 64
 Maj. Gen. Joseph R. Russ 	Apr 64 	Apr 66
 Maj. Gen. Patrick F. Cassidy 	Apr 66 	Jun 68
 Maj. Gen. George L. Mabry Jr. 	Jun 68 	Feb 69
 Maj. Gen. Elmer H. Almquist 	Feb 69 	Aug 70
 Maj. Gen. Donald V. Rattan 	Aug 70 	May 72
 Maj. Gen. Frederic E. Davison May 72 	Oct 73
 Maj. Gen. Joseph C. McDonough 	Oct 73 	Jul 75
 Maj. Gen. John R.D. Cleland 	Jul 75 	Jun 77
 Maj. Gen. Paul F. Gorman 	Jun 77 	May 79
 Maj. Gen. William J. Livsey 	May 79 	Jun 81
 Maj. Gen. Carl E. Vuono 	Jun 81 	Jun 83
 Maj. Gen. Charles W. Dyke	Jun 83 	Jun 85
 Maj. Gen. Orren R. Whiddon Jun 85 Jun 87
 Maj. Gen. Calvin A. H. Waller Jun 87 Jun 89
 Maj. Gen. David M. Maddox 	Jul 89 	Nov 90
 Maj. Gen. John P. Otjen 	Nov 90 	Jan 92

In Popular Culture

2010 movie A-Team, General Morrison (portrayed by actor Gerald McRaney) wears the UCP version of the 8th I.D. patch.
Soldiers in the camp are seen wearing the same patch in UCP.

In the 2002 WW2 Hallmark movie, "Silent Night", the US soldiers wear the 8th Infantry Division Patch.

References

Further reading
 Official History of the U.S. Army in World War II – also known as the "Green Books", contains brief mention of the 8th Division. Still available via the U.S. Government Printing Office. Specifically, see the following volumes:
 Breakout and Pursuit by Martin Blumenson
 The Siegfried Line Campaign by Charles MacDonald
 Boesch, Paul. Forest in Hell. Originally published as Road to Hurtgen: Forest in Hell). Memoir by officer of Company G, 121st Infantry Regiment.
 Griesbach, Marc. Combat History of the 8th Infantry Division in World War II, softcover booklet originally published 1945. Reprints made by Battery Press in Nashville, TN.
 A Combat History by Regiment and Special Units – a series of books by the Army/Navy Publishing Company released in 1945. Also known as "Blue Books", these were styled after school yearbooks and sold with dark blue covers, containing sketch histories and photos of men returning home. The following titles are known to exist:
 Division HQ & Special Troops 13th Infantry Regiment 28th Infantry Regiment 121st Infantry Regiment (The Gray Bonnet) Division Artillery and Arty unitsGordon L. Rottmen, Inside the US Army Today'', Osprey Publishing 1988

External links

 8th Infantry Division Association
 8th Infantry Division Archives 
 United States Army Center of Military History – 8th Infantry Division Combat log
 United States Army Center of Military History – 8th Infantry Division
 Interview conducted with Arthur C. Neriani, World War II veteran and member of the 8th Infantry Division during its liberation of the Wobbelin concentration camp near Ludwigslust, Germany
 These are My Credentials: The Story of the 8th Infantry Division
 
 Combat History of the 8th Division in World War II https://web.archive.org/web/20070526061151/http://www.techwarrior.cx/~roliver/8th/8th-pdf.htm

008th Infantry Division, U.S.
08
Infantry Division, U.S. 008
Infantry divisions of the United States Army in World War II
Military units and formations established in 1918
Military units and formations disestablished in 1992
1918 establishments in California